Robert Evans (born 1 July 1960) is  a former Australian rules footballer who played with Footscray in the Victorian Football League (VFL).

Notes

External links 		
		

		
		
		
Living people		
1960 births		
Australian rules footballers from Victoria (Australia)		
Western Bulldogs players
Coburg Football Club players